Central extension may refer to:

 Central Extension (Long Island Rail Road), a rail line
 Central extension (mathematics), a type of group extension